is a former Japanese football player.

Club statistics

References

External links

1981 births
Living people
Komazawa University alumni
Association football people from Iwate Prefecture
Japanese footballers
J2 League players
Vegalta Sendai players
Yokohama FC players
Iwate Grulla Morioka players
Association football defenders
Universiade medalists in football
Universiade gold medalists for Japan